HLA-B54 (B54) is an HLA-B serotype. B54 is a split antigen from the B22 broad antigen, sister serotypes are B55 and B56. The serotype identifies the more common HLA-B*55 gene products.

Serotype

Allele distribution

See also
HLA-serotype tutorial

References

5